Toshirō is a masculine Japanese given name.

Possible writings
Toshirō can be written using different combinations of kanji characters. Here are some examples:

利郎, "advantage, son"
敏郎, "agile, son"
俊郎, "sagacious, son"
利朗, "advantage, bright"
敏朗, "agile, bright"
俊朗, "sagacious, bright"

The name can also be written in hiragana としろう or katakana トシロウ.

Notable people with the name
Toshiro Ide (井手 俊郎, 1910–1988), Japanese screenwriter.
Toshiro Kageyama (影山 利郎, 1926–1990), Japanese Go player.
Toshiro Kandagawa (神田川 俊郎, 1939–2021), Japanese chef.
Toshiro Konishi (トシロウ・コニシ, 1953–2016), Japanese-Peruvian chef, musician and television personality.
Toshiro Masuda (増田 俊郎, born 1959), Japanese composer.
Toshiro Mayuzumi (黛 敏郎, 1929–1997), Japanese composer.
Toshirō Mifune (三船 敏郎, 1920–1997), Japanese actor.
Toshirō Mutō (武藤 敏郎, born 1943), former Deputy Governor of the Bank of Japan.
Toshiro Nomura (野村 敏郎), Japanese astronomer.
Toshihiro Ono (小野 敏洋, born 1965), a Japanese manga artist.
Toshiro Sasaki (佐左木 俊郎, 1900–1933), Japanese author.
Toshiro Suga (菅 俊朗, born 1950), aikido instructor.
, Japanese sport wrestler.
Toshiro Tomochika (友近 聡朗, born 1975), Japanese politician.
Toshiro Tsuchida (土田 俊郎, born 1964), Japanese game director.
Toshiro Yabuki (矢吹 俊郎, born 1961), Japanese music composer.
Toshiro Yamabe (山部 俊郎, 1926–2000), Japanese Go player.
Toshirō Yanagiba (柳葉 敏郎, born 1961), Japanese actor.

Fictional characters
Toshiro Kurusu (栗栖 敏郎), a character in the 2001 anime film WXIII: Patlabor the Movie 3.
Toshiro Hijikata (土方 十四郎), a character in the manga and anime series Gintama.
Toshiro Umezawa (梅澤 俊郎), a character in the collectible card game Magic: The Gathering.
Toshiro Hitsugaya (日番谷 冬獅郎), the captain of tenth division in Bleach.

Japanese masculine given names